Yes Madam is a 2003 Indian Tamil-language comedy drama film, directed by Rajaji, starring Prabhu, Vijayalakshmi and Vindhya. The film was released on 21 February 2003.

Plot

Cast 
Prabhu as Sivaramakrishnan
Vijayalakshmi as Gayathri
Vindhya as Sumathi
Goundamani as Ganesh Kumar
Senthil as Arvind Swamy
Manorama as Sivaramakrishnan's mother
Anandaraj as Doctor
Vennira Aadai Moorthy as Sivaramakrishnan's father
Alphonsa as Rani

Soundtrack 
Soundtrack was composed by Bharani.

Release 
The relative success of the film prompted the producers to sign Prabhu to work on a film titled Sabash Sagalai soon after release. Sherin was cast opposite Prabhu, though the film was later stalled.

References 

2003 films
Indian comedy-drama films
2000s Tamil-language films

External links